Hot Baby is a mini-album by South Korean girl group BESTie. It was released on July 28, 2014 by YNB Entertainment and distributed by Loen Entertainment as the group's first mini-album. On August 29, it was re-released as I Need You.

Background

"Pitapat"
"Pitapat" was released on July 12, 2013 as Bestie's debut single. It was composed by Super Changddai with production by Will Simms and Tom Havelock. The song's music video, which features comedian Yoo Se-yoon and 2AM's Jo Kwon, has been noted for its "fanservice shots" and "flirty" choreography.  Corynn Smith of MTV K gave the track a positive review, calling it "ear-worm-y" and highlighted its production team.

In South Korea, "Pitapat" debuted at number 126 on the Gaon Digital Chart for the week of July 7 to July 13, 2013, with 18,220 copies sold. The next week, the single jumped to its peak position of number 84. "Pitapat" charted for a total of four weeks, selling 42,588 digital downloads in the month of July.

A remix of "Pitapat" was included on Bestie's debut mini-album, Hot Baby.

"Thank U Very Much" and other digital singles
"연애의 조건" ("Love Options") was released as a second digital single on October 16, 2013, followed by "Thank U Very Much" on February 28, 2014.  The song was written and produced by Duble Sidekick, with additional arrangement by Radio Galaxi. The single debuted at number 118 on the Gaon Digital Chart, selling 19,116 copies in its first week. On the Billboard Korea K-pop Hot 100, it debuted at position 74 on the issue dated March 5, 2014.

"별처럼" ("Like a Star"; Byeolcheoreom) was released as a digital single on July 11, 2014.

Hot Baby and repackage
The Hot Baby mini-album was released on July 28, 2014, along with its title track.  In addition to the title track and two other new songs, the EP included the previously-released digital singles "Love Options", "Thank U Very Much" and "Like a Star", along with a remix of "Pitapat."

A digital-only repackaged version of the mini-album entitled I Need You was released on August 29, 2014 with a new track produced by Duble Sidekick and Homeboy.  The title track served as the promotional single for the new version.

Track listing

Digital Repackage

References

Dance-pop EPs
Korean-language EPs
2014 EPs